Julia Catherine Beckwith (March 10, 1796 – November 28, 1867) was credited as being Canada's first novelist.

Early life
Born in Fredericton, New Brunswick, she spent much of her early life in Nova Scotia and Quebec. Her mother Julie-Louise Le Brun, daughter of Jean Baptiste Le Brun de Duplessis, came from a wealthy French family who immigrated to Canada during the 17th and 18th century. Beckwith's father Nehemiah Beckwith (U. E. L.), was from New England and settled in New Brunswick in 1780, where he owned a successful ship building company.  It was through her travels to Quebec and Nova Scotia that she incorporated her experiences through her novels. Two years after Beckwith wrote her novel, her father died in a drowning accident and in 1820 and she was sent to live in Upper Canada (Kingston) with family where she would establish a boarding school for girls and meet and then marry George Henry Hart (between 1822–1824).

Career
Beckwith's mother had renounced her Roman Catholic faith and shared her husbands Methodist views, yet it was her mother's religious background that would provide the subject matter of Canada's first novel St Ursula's Covent (or The Nun of Canada) at the age of seventeen.

It took nearly over ten years for Beckwith to find someone who would publish her work.  In 1824, Hugh C. Thomson agreed to publish St. Ursula's Convent or, The Nun of Canada; Containing Scenes from Real Life, and as Beckwith wished, as an anonymous author.  However, only 165 copies were made.  After Beckwith's romantic novel was criticized as "too complicated", almost all copies were lost.

Later, Beckwith and her husband moved to the United States where she would write her second novel Tonnawanda ; or, The Adopted Son of America ; an Indian Story and was published in Rochester, N.Y., as "By an American."  In 1831 Beckwith, along with her husband and six children, moved back to Fredericton, where she would write her third novel in manuscript Edith (or The Doom) that was never published.

Later life and death
In 1831 she returned to Fredericton, New Brunswick. On November 28, 1867, Julia Catherine Beckwith died in Fredericton, New Brunswick at the age of 71.

Posthumous recognition
However, she was not recognized until at the end of the century when Canadian writing became of interest. In 1904, chief librarian of the Toronto Public Library, James Bain, obtained a copy of St. Ursula's Convent at an auction for $8.00. Only five other copies have been discovered (one at the Library of Congress in Washington, the others at the Bibliothèque Nationale de Quebec, Brock University and the University of New Brunswick) and one partial copy resides at the library of McGill University.

Personal life
She married George Henry Hart in Kingston, Ontario on January 3, 1822.

References

External links 
 
 

1796 births
1867 deaths
19th-century Canadian novelists
19th-century Canadian women writers
Canadian women novelists
Writers from Fredericton